Bryce Hoppel (born September 5, 1997) is an American middle-distance runner, who is a member of the 2020 U.S. Olympic track team for the 800 meters. He holds the American indoor record in the 1000 meters. Hoppel attended the University of Kansas. Hoppel had a breakout junior year at Kansas, where he won 21 consecutive races between the indoor and outdoor season, including two NCAA Individual Championships in the 800 meters. Hoppel's 21 race streak came to an end when Hoppel finished 3rd at the 2019 USA Track & Field Outdoor Championships, qualifying for the 2019 World Championships in Athletics.

Running career

High school 
Hoppel competed for Midland High School in Midland, Texas. At Midland High School, Hoppel won the 2016 Texas 6A State Track & Field Championship with a time of 1:49.67, included an undefeated season in the 800 meters. Hoppel broke school records in the 800 meters (1:49.67), 1,600 meters (4:10.51) and 3 miles (14:54.00) while at Midland, while graduating in the top-10 of his high school class.

College
While at the University of Kansas, Hoppel was a five-time All-American, two-time National Champion and four-time Big 12 Champion. In 2019, Hoppel completed a sweep of both the indoor and outdoor NCAA 800 meter titles, becoming the first male from the University of Kansas to win an NCAA title in the event. Hoppel's 21 race unbeaten streak began during the indoor season in 2019, lasting until the USATF Outdoor Championships on July 25. He trained under Coach Michael Whittlesey in Lawrence, Kansas.

Along the way of Hoppel's breakout season, he set the No. 5 fastest 800 meter time in NCAA history, running a 1:44.41 at the NCAA Outdoor Championships on June 7, 2019. Hoppel's time was just off the Kansas school record of 1:44.3 (m) set by the great Jim Ryun in 1966. Hoppel also set the Kansas indoor school record of 1:46.46 on May 9, 2019, while breaking facility records at the Birmingham Crossplex and John McDonnell Field, among others.

While at the University of Kansas, Hoppel thrived under the coaching of Head Coach Stanley Redwine and Assistant Coach Michael Whittlesey.

Professional 
Upon the conclusion of his junior season, Hoppel announced he would forego his final year of NCAA eligibility to pursue a professional running career.  In his first competition representing Team USA, Hoppel placed fourth overall at the Pan-American Championships in Lima, Peru, running a 1:47.48.

Hoppel announced on August 17, 2019 that he had signed a professional contract with Adidas.

Hoppel competed at the 2019 World Championships in Athletics, on the basis of his third-place finish at the US Championships. After completing a full three seasons of collegiate running, Hoppel secured a 4th-place finish in the 800 meter final on October 1, 2019, one year and one month after his season-opening cross-country race at the Bob Timmons Invitational on September 1, 2018. Remarkably, he was able to set another personal best, finishing a long season in style with a 1:44.25 performance.

On February 15, 2020, Hoppel earned his first national title at the USA Track & Field Indoor Championships, held in Albuquerque, New Mexico, running a time of 1:46.67 to win the 800m final.

In August 2020, Hoppel competed in the Monaco Herculis meeting, where he was narrowly defeated by fellow American and reigning 800 meter world champion Donavan Brazier. In that race, Hoppel dropped his personal best in the 800 meters to 1:43.23.

Hoppel began his 2021 campaign with a 1:44.37 indoor 800 meter in Fayetteville, Arkansas. At the time, this was the 2nd fastest indoor 800 meter in American history, behind only American record holder Donavan Brazier.

On February 13, 2021, Hoppel competed in the 1000 meter run at the New Balance Indoor Grand Prix. In that race, he won comfortably, setting a new American record in the indoor 1000 meters with his time of 2:16.27.

On June 21, 2021, Hoppel qualified for the US Olympic team in the 800 meters.  Hoppel finished third in the Olympic trials in Eugene, Oregon with a time of 1:44.14, qualifying him for the Tokyo Olympics in July and August 2021.

In the 800m event at the 2020 Olympics Bryce finished in 3rd place in his round 1 qualifying heat with a time of 1:45.64, qualifying him for the semifinals where he ran in 5th place with a time of 1:44.91	which did not allow him to continue on to the finals.

Bryce won the Millrose Games 800 with a time of 1:46.05 on 1/29/2022 in New York City. At the 2/6/2022 New Balance Indoor Grand Prix, Bryce placed in 2nd in the 800m with a time of 1:46.08

Personal life 
Hoppel is the son of Monty and Rita Hoppel and has two older siblings, Kelsey and Megan. His father is the general manager for the Midland RockHounds Double-A minor league affiliate of the Oakland Athletics in the Texas League.

At the University of Kansas, Hoppel studied business finance. He is Catholic.

References

External links

 
 
 
 
 

1997 births
Living people
American male middle-distance runners
Athletes (track and field) at the 2019 Pan American Games
Pan American Games track and field athletes for the United States
USA Indoor Track and Field Championships winners
Kansas Jayhawks men's track and field athletes
Olympic male middle-distance runners
Track and field athletes from Texas
Athletes (track and field) at the 2020 Summer Olympics
Olympic track and field athletes of the United States
World Athletics Indoor Championships medalists
21st-century American people